The 1950 United States Senate election in Oklahoma took place on November 7, 1950. Incumbent Democratic Senator Elmer Thomas ran for re-election to a fifth term. However, though he had successfully beat back primary challengers in past elections, he was ultimately defeated by Congressman Mike Monroney. Monroney advanced to the general election, where he faced Reverend Bill Alexander, the Republican nominee. Despite the national Republican landslide, Monroney defeated Alexander by a wide margin, holding the seat for the Democratic Party.

Democratic primary

Candidates
 Mike Monroney, U.S. Congressman from Oklahoma's 5th congressional district
 Elmer Thomas, incumbent U.S. Senator
 Joe B. Thompson
 Bill Edwards
 C. A. Gentry
 J.R. Champ Clarke
 Robert Teeter

Results

Runoff election results

Republican primary

Candidates
 Bill Alexander, pastor of First Christian Church of Oklahoma
 Raymond H. Fields, newspaperman
 George T. Balch
 Forrest Van Pelt

Results

General election

Results

References

Oklahoma
1950
1950 Oklahoma elections